Shallum Asher Xavier is a Pakistani guitarist, composer and music producer. He has been recording professionally for 15 years, and has played as a session musician and recorded with artists including Ali Haider, Najam Shiraz, Zeb and Haniya, Hadiqa Kiyani, and Strings.

In 2003 Xavier, with Imran Momina formed the band Fuzön. Shallum is currently working on his own album which features various artists from across borders.

Xavier had been awarded Best Guitarist of Pakistan 2 years running, as well as an award for Best South Asian Band and Best Composer for his composition of Khamaj. He has collaborated independently with Ingrid Kindem, Hildegun and Mocci (Fryd), and has performed with them on a number of occasions in both Pakistan and Norway.

Biography
Born in Karachi, Pakistan, in 1978 to Samuel and Shirin Xavier, Shallum is the second of four siblings, and the oldest son. He grew up around music and musicians, and began experimenting on the keyboard when he was eight. Inspired by the American pastor at his Sunday school who played the guitar, Xavier knew he wanted to play live music, and began to teach himself.

Start of Career
Adopting Steve Vai and Joe Satriani as his mentors, the switch to guitar was complete.  Xavier saved up his allowance, and bought his first acoustic guitar for Rs. 1000 from a chappati wala (roadside flatbread vendor) who had an after hours job at a guitar manufacturing workshop. He used this guitar for 3 years, bruising and cutting himself on the low-grade quality. He then sought out a musician who would teach him the basics of guitar and musical theory. Roland lived across the street from Xavier and started teaching him. Xavier would also trek over by bus to a place near the commercial hub of Karachi where there would be rejected publications, and buy guitar player magazines- the only source for information on music available at the time.

Xavier did not have many friends, so when he discovered one other person in his neighborhood, Ovais, who was apart from the rest like himself, he found someone equally involved and determined about learning as much as possible about music and musicians internationally. Before long, some of Xavier's school friends from Saint Paul's English High School also started learning various instruments, and when Xavier was 14, they formed a band. They would practice day and night, often for twelve hours at a stretch.  As for Xavier, this was when he started focusing exclusively on who and what he wanted to be.

Breaking the silence 
Xavier would spend his evenings isolated in the veranda outside the kitchen, and, in the backdrop of the noisy Karachi streets and the pleasant shouts of children playing cricket, used to practice for hours. Naturally reserved, in pursuit of learning and perfecting his craft he forced himself out of his shell. He would listen to music, seek out musicians, and make an effort to talk to other guitarists.

Karachi had a significant underground music culture. Television's scope was limited at the time, and consequently there was quality live music being performed at restaurants and other public places. Serious musicians were accessible to Xavier, and he made sure to take every advantage to network and learn from them. From the first few chords Xavier learned, he started composing melodies of his own. He would compose songs, and always knew he would write his own music, but realized he would have to know the industry first.

Under pressure
As Xavier became more and more consumed by his music, the pressure mounted on him to choose a career. Music was not considered to be an actual career path, especially for the oldest son. The way forward to an economically stable future was seen to be in quality education, not talent and drive in the arts. For Xavier to give up his music would have been giving up a piece of himself. Pressure from family forces you to make difficult decisions, and Xavier stuck to what he believed in. He knew that one day he would be doing what he's doing now. There was nothing else for him. And so, while he completed his Bachelor of Commerce at Government National College Karachi, Xavier decided that he had to learn the business of music.

The commerce of chords 
At 16 Xavier met Imran Momina, better known as Immu, who would remain an integral part of his music career. Immu, who was older, knew many professional musicians at the time. Xavier spent increasing amounts of time with them, learning about the business side of the music industry to counter the pressure at home. The music industry was growing in leaps and bounds in the mid-1990s. There had been a significant gap in the popular music industry post Vital Signs, and as Junoon came in to fill that gap it was an exciting new time for musicians. While that time was exciting for musicians creatively, it was professionally difficult because of the political situation. Post Zia ul-Haq, artistic expression was publicly just starting out again after over a decade of forced silence, and Karachi was suffering from severe violent outbursts frequently. Even Junoon had trouble for their first 6 years or so.

Already well connected in the music industry, Immu not only introduced Xavier to musicians, but also a lot of producers. Xavier began working at Hill Music Station, run by Mohsin Raza Khan, better known as “Bunny,” which is when Xavier began seriously experimenting and planning. He used to spend days and nights at a time learning, practicing and jamming. People started liking his music, and Xavier started getting some sessions to play. Creative, spontaneous, quick to deliver, and naturally gifted, session music was not as difficult for Xavier as it could have been, and it gave him the courage and energy to move forward professionally and creatively. Xavier played in almost every studio that existed at the time, and played sessions for all the musicians in the industry, including Strings, Najam Shiraz, Ali Haider, and Hadiqa Kayyani, and performed at Café Blue and New York Café. The youngest among the musicians he was spending time with, Xavier had his first studio experience at the age of 16, recording an album in 2 days. Making music for other people was a way to make money to support themselves, but it was just a break-even situation financially.

References

External links
Fuzon
Shallum in Oslo
The Musik Awards 2008
Indus Awards
The Birth of Cool Birth Of Cool.pdf

1978 births
Living people
Pakistani guitarists
Pakistani musicians
X
Pakistani Christians
Musicians from Karachi
21st-century guitarists